Drigg is a railway station on the Cumbrian Coast Line, which runs between  and . It is owned by Network Rail and managed by Northern Trains.

The station is unstaffed, but the main station building still stands and is in private commercial use as a cafe and craft shop.

At the south end of the station is a level crossing with manually-operated gates, controlled from the adjacent signal box. There is step-free access to each platform, however the platforms are lower than the standard ones and are therefore not suitable for mobility-impaired passengers.

Waiting shelters and timetable posters are located on each side of the track, train running information for the station can also obtained by telephone. A ticket machine and digital information screens were installed by operator Northern in 2019, so passengers can now purchase tickets before boarding the train.

A short distance from the station, heavy secured sidings take special trains carrying nuclear materials from the Sellafield nuclear site (which is located close by) to the Low Level Waste Repository where the material is buried. Paul Merton visited the station en route to the Repository in the first episode of his 2016 travel documentary Paul Merton's Secret Stations.

Services

There is an hourly service southbound to Barrow-in-Furness and northbound to Whitehaven,  and Carlisle for much of the day (with slightly longer gaps mid-morning and in the late afternoon).

There is no service after 21:00 each evening, but a Sunday service was introduced with the May 2018 timetable change and is still in operation.  Seven northbound and nine southbound trains call if required.

References

External links

 
 

Railway stations in Cumbria
DfT Category F2 stations
Former Furness Railway stations
Railway stations in Great Britain opened in 1849
Northern franchise railway stations
Railway request stops in Great Britain
1849 establishments in England